In politics, dual loyalty is loyalty to two separate interests that potentially conflict with each other, leading to a conflict of interest.

Inherently controversial
While nearly all examples of alleged "dual loyalty" are considered highly controversial, they point to the inherent difficulty in distinguishing between what constitutes a "danger" of dual loyalty, a pair of misaligned interests, versus what might be more simply a pair of partially-aligned or even, according to the party being accused, a pair of fully-aligned interests. For example, immigrants who still have feelings of loyalty to their country of origin often insist that their two (or more) loyalties do not conflict. As Stanley A. Renshon at the Center for Immigration Studies noted,

Transnationalist interpretations
Some scholars refer to a growing trend of transnationalism and suggest that as societies become more heterogeneous and multicultural, the term "dual loyalty" had increasingly become a meaningless bromide. According to the theory of transnationalism, migration and other factors, including improved global communication, produce new forms of identity that transcend traditional notions of physical and cultural space. Nina Glick Schiller, Linda Basch, and Cristina Blanc-Szanton define a process by which immigrants "link together" their country of origin and their country of settlement.

The transnationalist view is that "dual loyalty" is a potentially-positive expression of multi-culturalism and can contribute to the diversity and strength of civil society. That view is popular in many academic circles, but others are skeptical of the idea. As one paper describes it,

Beyond its usage in particular instances, the terms "dual loyalty" and "transnationalism" continue to be the subject of much debate. As one academic wrote:

Historical examples

Other historical examples of actual or perceived "dual loyalty" include the following:
 During World War II, a number of United States citizens of Japanese, German, and Italian ancestry, including some born in the U.S., were confined to internment camps (see Internment of Japanese Americans).
 Roman Catholics are subject to the Pope on religious matters. This has often perceived as dual loyalty by powers opposed to the Holy See.
 During the English Reformation, many important English and Scottish Catholics, such as Thomas More, Mary, Queen of Scots and Edmund Campion, were tried and executed for their alleged double loyalty to the Papacy and infidelity to the Crown.
 During John F. Kennedy's campaign for and brief tenure as U.S. President, some opponents questioned whether a Roman Catholic President of the United States had a divided loyalty with respect to the Papacy and Vatican City.
 Chinese Catholics have been forced by the government of the People's Republic of China of substituting the Roman Catholic Church in China by the Chinese Patriotic Catholic Association.
 Jews who were part of the Jewish diaspora have been accused of dual loyalty by the Romans in the 1st century, by the French in the Dreyfus Affair in the late 19th century, and in Stalin-era Soviet Union in the 20th century. Before the creation of Israel, Jewish anti-Zionists used the accusation against other Jews. While today some use the phrase in a "neutral and non-pejorative fashion," John J. Mearsheimer and Stephen M. Walt say this use can obscure the fact that home nations and Israel may have sharp political differences. The 1991 Gulf War and the 2003 U.S. invasion of Iraq lead to such accusations against Jewish neoconservatives, vocal proponents of war against Iraq who were alleged by some critics of the Iraq War to have sought to undermine Arab nations hostile to Israel (e.g., by the term "Israel-firster"). In 2019, Representative Ilhan Omar was bipartisanly accused of suggesting that pro-Israeli American Jews had dual loyalty towards Israel.
 The loyalty of many Americans to the U.S. government was called into question during the Cold War due to alleged Communist sympathies, resulting in "witch-hunts" of various government officials, celebrities and other citizens (see McCarthyism).
 Muslims living in Western countries, especially during periods of heightened tensions between Muslim minorities and non-Muslims, such as after September 11, 2001, or during the Jyllands-Posten cartoons controversy of 2005–2006, are sometimes accused of being more loyal to the Muslim ummah than to their country.
 "Dual loyalty" continues to be a concern of critics of US immigration policy, particularly in those states which border Mexico.
 The Hindu minority in the majority-Muslim Bangladesh has often been accused of dual loyalty to the neighbour state of India by the Bangladesh Nationalist Party and even by Sheikh Hasina who heads the largest political outfit in Bangladesh hailing secularism.
The Ahmadiyya movement in Islam has been accused by some Muslims of dual loyalty to the state of Israel, or less frequently the Hindu-majority state of India.
 The government of the Islamic Republic of Iran has accused the Baháʼí Faith minority of having loyalty to foreign powers (see Iranian anti-Baháʼí conspiracy theories).
During the impeachment of Donald Trump in 2020, some Republican Members of Congress accused Lieutenant-Colonel Alexander Vindman of dual loyalty towards Ukraine due to his Ukrainian heritage.

See also

References

Human behavior
Human migration
Political science